West-Graftdijk is a village in the Dutch province of North Holland. It is a part of the municipality of Alkmaar, and lies about 10 km south of the city of Alkmaar. The village has a small historical church, and to the north there is the bird area Eilandspolder.

History 
The village was first mentioned in 1578 as "Graefdyeck ofte Vuylen Graft", and means "dike on (de Vuylen) Graft River". West- has been added to distinguish from Oost-Graftdijk. West-Graftdijk developed on the former island  in the second half of the 16th century after a dike was built around the lake.

The Dutch Reformed church is an aisleless church with wooden tower which was built on a terp (artificial living hill) in 1651. The church was extensively modified in 1792. West-Graftdijk was home to 465 people in 1840.

Gallery

References

Populated places in North Holland
Alkmaar